The 17th Special Tactics Squadron is one of the ten Special Tactics Squadrons of United States Air Force Special Operations Command. It is garrisoned at Fort Benning, Georgia.

Overview
Special Tactics operators with the 17th STS, 24th Special Operations Wing, Air Force Special Operations Command, deploy with special operations forces to provide joint terminal attack control and maximize the impacts of air power by controlling and directing precise strikes to destroy the enemy.  The squadron's primary mission is to provide special tactics TACPs to the Army's 75th Ranger Regiment for unconventional operations.

Organization
The 17th STS is made up of a headquarters unit and two operational detachments. The headquarters unit is stationed at Fort Benning, Georgia. Detachment 1 (Red Team) is stationed at Hunter Army Airfield, Georgia and is attached to 1st Battalion, 75th Ranger Regiment. Detachment 2 (Silver Team) is stationed at Fort Lewis, Washington and is attached to the 2d Battalion, 75th Ranger Regiment. Each detachment consists of 13 TACPs and one ALO.

Lineage
 Constituted as the 17th Air Support Operations Squadron on 24 June 1994 
 Activated on 1 July 1994
 Redesignated 17th Special Tactics Squadron on 8 August 2013

Assignments
18th Air Support Operations Group 1 July 1994
720th Special Tactics Group 1 October 2008 – 30 September 2020
724th Special Tactics Group 1 October 2020 – present

Stations
Fort Benning, Georgia, 1 July 1994 – present

See also
List of United States Air Force special tactics squadrons

References

Notes

Bibliography

Further reading

External links

 24th globalsecurity.org

017
017
Military units and formations established in 1994